Vennur  is a village in Pazhayannur Gram Panchayat Thrissur district in the state of Kerala, India.

References

Villages in Thrissur district